Filip Božić (born 9 March 1999) is a Bosnian-Herzegovinian football midfielder who plays for Serbian club OFK Beograd.

Club career
Born in Paraćin, Filip Božić played in OFK Beograd academy. Later, in summer 2017, he signed with FK Partizan where he played in the youth team. During winter-break of the 2017–18 season he signed with FK Mačva Šabac.

International career
Despite having been born in Paraćin, Serbia, he decided to represent Bosnia and Herzegovina internationally having debuted for their under 17 team in 2016.

References

1999 births
Living people
People from Paraćin
Association football midfielders
Bosnia and Herzegovina footballers
Bosnia and Herzegovina youth international footballers
OFK Beograd players
FK Mačva Šabac players
RFK Grafičar Beograd players
Serbian SuperLiga players